The Carter-Moriah Range of mountains is located in the White Mountains, in Coos County, New Hampshire. The range forms the northern east side of Pinkham Notch, opposite the northern Presidential Range. The range is also referred to as the Carter Range.

Summits
From north to south:
{|
|• Shelburne Moriah Mountain || (1,138 m / 3,735 ft)
|-
|• Middle Moriah Mountain || (1,145 m / 3,755 ft)
|-
|• Mount Moriah  || (1,234 m / 4,049 ft) *
|-
|• Imp Mountain  || (1,134 m / 3,720 ft)
|-
|• North Carter Mountain  || (1,381 m / 4,530 ft)
|-
|• Middle Carter Mountain  || (1,741 m / 4,600 ft) *
|-
|• South Carter Mountain || (1,741 m / 4,420 ft) *
|-
|• Mount Hight || (1,425 m / 4,675 ft)
|-
|• Carter Dome || (1,473 m / 4,832 ft) *
|}

While not strictly part of the range, Wildcat Mountain (1,345 m / 4,422 ft) * stands southwest of Carter Dome, facing it across Carter Notch.

The summits marked with an asterisk (*) are included on the Appalachian Mountain Club's peak-bagging list of "Four-thousand footers" in New Hampshire; the others are excluded, in some cases because of insufficient elevation and in others because of insufficient topographic prominence.

Watersheds
The Carter-Moriah Range drains to the northwest into the Peabody River and to the southeast into the Wild River. Both flow into the Androscoggin River—at Gorham, New Hampshire and Gilead, Maine respectively—and thence into the Atlantic Ocean on the coast of Maine.

See also
 List of mountains in New Hampshire
 White Mountain National Forest

References

Mountain ranges of New Hampshire
White Mountains (New Hampshire)
Landforms of Coös County, New Hampshire
White Mountain National Forest